This is a list of members of the Council of the German Cultural Community between 1977 and 1978, following the direct elections of 1977.

Composition

Sources
 

List
1970s in Belgium